Gnomidolon bellulum is a species of beetle in the family Cerambycidae. It was described by Martins in 2006.

References

Gnomidolon
Beetles described in 2006